Pit beef is a dish of roast beef prepared over a charcoal fire, commonly using top round cuts of beef. The cooked roast is sliced thinly and often served on a Kaiser roll, accompanied by tiger sauce (horseradish and mayonnaise) and sliced raw onion. Unlike barbecue, the meat is cooked quickly at high temperatures, served rare, and has a light smoke flavor. 

The preparation is a local specialty in the area around Baltimore, Maryland. The origin of the specific name "pit beef" dates to the 1970s on Baltimore's east side, along Pulaski Highway, and became popular in the 1980s.

Although associated with the working-class neighborhoods around Bethlehem Sparrows Point Shipyard, pit beef owes much to the German and Jewish food cultures of Baltimore. The Kaiser roll was popularized by the city's large German immigrant population and tiger sauce was first produced by Tulkoff Foods, a kosher horseradish manufacturer. Tiger sauce is named after the founder's son, Sol Tulkoff's 802nd Tank Destroyer Battalion during World War II.

See also
 Bull roast
 List of beef dishes

References

Barbecue
Beef dishes
Cuisine of Baltimore
German-American cuisine
German-American culture in Baltimore
Jewish American cuisine
Jews and Judaism in Baltimore